Pilgrim I may refer to:
Pilgrim I (archbishop of Salzburg) (died 923)
Pellegrino I of Aquileia (died 1161), called Pilgrim I in German